Aziz Ismail Ansari (born February 23, 1983) is an American actor and stand-up comedian. He is known for his role as Tom Haverford on the NBC series Parks and Recreation (2009–2015) and as creator and star of the Netflix series Master of None (2015–) for which he won several acting and writing awards, including two Emmys and a Golden Globe, which was the first award received by an Indian American and Asian American actor for acting on television.

Ansari began performing comedy in New York City, while a student at NYU Stern in 2000. He later co-created and starred in the MTV sketch comedy show Human Giant, after which he had acting roles in a number of feature films. From 2009 to 2015, Ansari gained prominence for his role as Tom Haverford in the NBC sitcom Parks and Recreation. In 2015, Ansari co-created, and starred in the first two seasons of Netflix's critically acclaimed series Master of None which he also served as a writer and director.

As a stand-up comedian, Ansari released his first comedy special, Intimate Moments for a Sensual Evening, in January 2010 on Comedy Central Records. He continues to perform stand-up on tour and on Netflix. His first book, Modern Romance: An Investigation, was released in June 2015. He was included in the Time 100 list of most influential people in 2016. In July 2019, Ansari released his fifth comedy special Aziz Ansari: Right Now, which was nominated for a Grammy Award for Best Comedy Album. In 2021, Netflix released Master of None Presents: Moments in Love, which Ansari wrote and directed. The following year he released his comedy special Aziz Ansari: Nightclub Comedian on Netflix.

Early life 
Aziz Ansari was born in Columbia, South Carolina to Indian immigrants from Tamil Nadu. His parents are Tamil Muslims, though Ansari himself is non-religious. He has a younger brother, Aniz, who is seven years his junior. Ansari grew up in Bennettsville, South Carolina where he attended Marlboro Academy as well as the South Carolina Governor's School for Science and Mathematics. He graduated from the New York University Stern School of Business in 2004, with a Bachelor of Business degree in marketing. His mother, Fatima, is an obstetrician and gynecologist and his father, Shoukath, is a gastroenterologist. Both of his parents appeared in the first two seasons of Master of None.

Career

Early career
Ansari frequently performed at the Upright Citizens Brigade Theatre, as well as weekly shows such as Invite Them Up. In 2005, Rolling Stone included him in their annual "Hot List" as their choice for the "Hot Standup", and he won the Jury Award for "Best Standup" at HBO's 2006 U.S. Comedy Arts Festival in Aspen, Colorado.

Human Giant

Around the summer of 2005, Ansari began collaborating with fellow comedians Rob Huebel and Paul Scheer (both from the improv troupe Respecto Montalban), as well as director Jason Woliner to make short films. The first series created by the group was Shutterbugs, which followed Huebel and Ansari as cutthroat child talent agents. This was followed up by the Illusionators, which starred Ansari and Scheer as Criss Angel–style goth magicians. In mid-2006, MTV greenlit Human Giant, a sketch series from the group, which debuted April 5, 2007. The show ran for two seasons and the group was offered a third season, but they opted to pursue other opportunities. Ansari had been offered the role of Tom Haverford on Parks and Recreation, and since the members wrote everything together, they decided, as Scheer told Vulture, "it would be better if we walked away as friends instead of burn out on each other and the show."

Parks and Recreation
In June 2008, Ansari was announced as the first cast hire for NBC's comedy Parks and Recreation. The show debuted in April 2009 with Ansari playing one of the main characters, Tom Haverford, for the show's seven seasons. Ansari's performance was praised by critics, including Entertainment Weekly, TV Guide, and Yahoo! TV, which placed him in the No. 1 spot on its list of "TV MVPS".

Master of None
Starting in November 2015, Ansari starred as Dev Shah in the Netflix original series Master of None, which he created and wrote with Parks and Recreation writer Alan Yang. James Poniewozik of The New York Times called the show "the year's best comedy straight out of the gate" and praised its genre-crossing appeal. The show initially ran for two seasons. Production work began on a third season in early 2020 in London, but was put on hold because of the COVID-19 pandemic. By January 2021, production was getting ready to resume, with Naomi Ackie joining the cast. The season was released in May 23, 2021.

Ansari's performance in the show earned him a nomination for the Golden Globe Award for Best Actor – Television Series Musical or Comedy. The series earned four Emmy nominations in 2016: Outstanding Comedy Series, Outstanding Writing for a Comedy Series for Ansari and Yang, and Outstanding Directing for a Comedy Series and Outstanding Lead Actor in a Comedy Series for Ansari; Yang and Ansari won the Emmy for Outstanding Writing for a Comedy Series for the episode "Parents". Yang and Ansari were also honored with a Peabody Award in May 2016 for the series.

In 2018 Ansari won a Golden Globe for best actor in a TV comedy for the show; this made him the first Asian-American actor to win a Golden Globe for acting in television.

Other television work

In addition to his work on Parks and Recreation, Ansari appeared on the HBO series Flight of the Conchords as an eccentric and prejudiced fruit vendor. He had a recurring role in season eight of the ABC sitcom Scrubs as Ed, a new intern at the hospital. Ansari's character was written off the show so he could work on Parks and Recreation. Ansari also has a recurring role on the animated comedy Bob's Burgers as Darryl.

In August 2011, Ansari made a cameo appearance in the music video for "Otis" by Jay-Z and Kanye West from their collaborative album Watch the Throne.

Ansari hosted the January 21, 2017 episode of Saturday Night Live, becoming the first person of Indian origin to do so.

Film career
Ansari has made appearances in several films, including Get Him to the Greek, I Love You, Man, 30 Minutes or Less, This Is the End, and Observe and Report. In 2009, Ansari appeared in the Judd Apatow film Funny People. Apatow liked Ansari's character, "Randy", and commissioned him and Human Giant collaborator Jason Woliner to create online shorts centered around his character, to promote the film. These shorts proved successful and the character became the subject of one of the film ideas Ansari and Woliner are developing for Apatow Productions. Two other ideas in development are Let's Do This, a road movie about two motivational speakers, and an untitled film about two disgraced astronauts who must return to space to clear their names. Ansari is attached to star in another film with Danny McBride based on an idea from Ansari and 30 Rock writer Matt Hubbard. In April 2010, it was announced that Ansari would star in the film 30 Minutes or Less. The film was directed by Ruben Fleischer and co-starred Jesse Eisenberg and McBride. The film was released on August 12, 2011.

Stand-up comedy

Ansari tours as a stand-up comedian. In 2006 and 2007, he toured with the Comedians of Comedy and Flight of the Conchords. In late 2008 and early 2009, his own comedy tour, the Glow in the Dark Tour, became the basis for a DVD/CD special for Comedy Central. The set, titled Intimate Moments for a Sensual Evening, aired January 17, 2010.

Ansari's comedy style tends to focus on aspects of his personal life. "I like talking about things that are going on in my life, because that's always going to be different and original", he says. "No one else is gonna be talking about my personal experiences".

In July 2010, Ansari began a new tour, Dangerously Delicious, which was in theaters across the United States; stops included the Bonnaroo Music Festival and Carnegie Hall in New York City. The tour wrapped with a filming for a special, Dangerously Delicious at the Warner Theatre in Washington, D.C., in June 2011. This special was released on his website in March 2012 for download or stream.

In March 2012, Ansari announced a new tour entitled "Buried Alive", with dates scheduled for Q2/Q3 2012. A third stand-up special, Aziz Ansari: Buried Alive, was filmed during the tour at the Merriam Theater in Philadelphia, Pennsylvania, and premiered on Netflix on November 1, 2013. His 2015 special, Aziz Ansari: Live at Madison Square Garden, also premiered on Netflix.

In February 2019, Ansari began a new stand-up tour entitled The Road to Nowhere, which was his official public return after the sexual-misconduct allegations and media backlash that put his career on a year-long hiatus in 2018. The performance was a response to the events of that past year, and touched on topics ranging from cultural appropriation, racism to sexual misconduct. His next comedy special Aziz Ansari: Right Now was released on July 9, 2019, followed by Aziz Ansari: Nightclub Comedian, released on January 25, 2022.

In May 2019, Ansari teamed up with Dave Chappelle for three shows in Austin, Texas at the Paramount Theatre.

Writing

Ansari's book, Modern Romance: An Investigation, was released on June 16, 2015. The book is about the comedic pitfalls of dating in the modern world and was written with sociologist Eric Klinenberg.

Directing

In February 2022, Ansari was set to make his feature directorial debut with a dramedy film titled Being Mortal starring Bill Murray, Keke Palmer and Seth Rogen. It is an adaptation of the non-fiction book Being Mortal: Medicine and What Matters in the End by surgeon Atul Gawande, published in 2014. In April 2022, production of the film was halted due to a complaint of inappropriate behavior by Murray on set.

Personal life
Ansari was raised as a Muslim, but has described himself as "not religious" on Twitter.

In 2014, he identified as a feminist, saying his girlfriend has helped influence him. Ansari also incorporated an episode about feminism titled "Ladies and Gentlemen" in Master of None. In an interview in 2015, he spoke about the episode's meaningfulness to him saying "I thought it was interesting that this is happening, yet so many people are unaware of it. And the problem is people aren't talking about it. What I've learned, as a guy, is to just ask women questions and listen to what they have to say. Go to your group of female friends and ask them about times they've experienced sexism at their job, and you'll get blown away by the things they tell you."

Ansari is a "foodie" (although he dislikes the term); he and his friends Eric Wareheim and Jason Woliner have formed what they called "The Food Club", which involves them dressing up in suits and captain hats and rewarding restaurants with "Food Club" plaques. The plaques have their faces engraved along with the words: "The Food Club has dined here and deemed it plaque-worthy". He explained to Vanity Fair, "It's a really serious-looking plaque and all of the restaurants we've given it to have put it front and center. It's funny because people will walk into a restaurant and be like, 'What the fuck is the Food Club? Who are these guys etched in gold?'" They also produced a tongue-in-cheek video about the club for Jash, filming them debating whether or not restaurants were plaque-worthy.

Ansari was a close friend of the comedian Harris Wittels and they frequently worked together. He has a brother, Aniz Adam Ansari, who co-wrote an episode of Master of None.

Ansari purchased an apartment in Tribeca, Downtown Manhattan in 2018 that had previously been owned by New York Rangers captain Ryan McDonagh for US$5.7 million.

In December 2021, it was reported that Ansari had become engaged to Danish forensic data scientist Serena Skov Campbell. In June 2022, Ansari and Campbell got married, with their wedding being held in Tuscany, Italy.

Allegation of sexual misconduct
In January 2018, a woman using the pseudonym "Grace" accused Ansari of sexual misconduct in an article on Babe.net, a website that was aimed at Millennial and Gen-Z readers. According to the article, the woman later texted Ansari expressing her discomfort, and he replied to her with an apology.

Media critic Allison Davis, who later interviewed the article's author, Katie Way, called the Babe.net article "some combination of as-told-to and reported piece and morning-after group-chat gossip", saying that it became a "flashpoint of discussion about #MeToo". There was disagreement in media commentary as to whether the incident described in the Babe article constituted sexual misconduct. Some agreed with Ansari, who stated that the encounter "by all indications was completely consensual", while others stated that his actions were misogynistic, lacked affirmative consent, and spoke to a larger culture of harmful male expectations. Others say that Ansari's actions did not constitute sexual misconduct and that his accuser's narrative trivializes the #MeToo movement against forms of sexual abuse. Way was criticized for her handling of the story and for not following accepted journalistic standards. For The Atlantic, James Hamblin wrote that these "stories of gray areas are exactly what [...] need to be told and discussed." "Even Ansari, the semi-ironic expert who authored a book on interpersonal communication [...] was seeing something totally different from his date, Grace", who felt coerced. Ansari briefly receded from the public eye following the incident and resumed performing stand-up comedy in May 2018.

Filmography

Film

Television

Music videos

Discography 
Intimate Moments for a Sensual Evening (Comedy Central Records, 2010)
Dangerously Delicious (Comedy Central Records, 2012)
Buried Alive (Comedy Central Records, 2015)

Standup specials 
Intimate Moments for a Sensual Evening (released on Comedy Central and DVD, 2010)
Aziz Ansari: Dangerously Delicious (released on Aziz's Website, 2012)
Aziz Ansari: Buried Alive (released on Netflix, 2013)
Aziz Ansari: Live at Madison Square Garden (released on Netflix, 2015)
Aziz Ansari: Right Now (released on Netflix, 2019)
 Aziz Ansari: Nightclub Comedian (released on Netflix, 2022)

Bibliography

Awards and nominations
In 2016, Ansari was the recipient of Smithsonian Magazine's American Ingenuity Award for Performing Arts. In 2017, Rolling Stone ranked Aziz Ansari 49th in their list of greatest stand-up comedians of all time.

References

External links

 
 

1983 births
Living people
21st-century American comedians
21st-century American male actors
American former Muslims
American comedians of Indian descent
American feminists
American male actors of Indian descent
American male comedians
American male film actors
American male television actors
American male television writers
American sketch comedians
American stand-up comedians
American television writers
American people of Indian Tamil descent
Best Musical or Comedy Actor Golden Globe (television) winners
Comedians from South Carolina
Male actors from Columbia, South Carolina
Male actors from South Carolina
Male feminists
New York University Stern School of Business alumni
Peabody Award winners
People from Bennettsville, South Carolina
People from Columbia, South Carolina
Primetime Emmy Award winners
Third Man Records artists
Upright Citizens Brigade Theater performers
Writers from Columbia, South Carolina